Min Yeong-hwan (민영환, 閔泳煥; 7 August 1861 - 30 November 1905) was a politician, diplomat, and general of the Korean Empire and known as a conservative proponent for reform. He was born in Seoul into the powerful Yeoheung Min clan which Heungseon Daewongun hated, and committed suicide as an act of resistance against the Eulsa Treaty imposed by Japan on Korea. He is remembered today for his efforts on behalf of Korean independence in the waning days of the Joseon dynasty and a statue to his memory now stands on a traffic island near Chungjeongno Intersection, his namesake, after having previously been located at Anguk Intersection in 1957, before being moved due to road widening to near Donhwa Gate of Changdeok Palace in 1970 where it was criticized for not matching the surroundings, and then near the General Post Office next to Jogye Temple in 2003, where it was reportedly neglected until 2022.

Biography

Early life 
On 7 August 1861, Min was born in to the Yeoheung Min clan. Min's father, Min Gyeom-ho (민겸호, 閔謙鎬) was the Minister of Finance (Hojo). Min Young-hwan passed the Gwageo literary examination in 1878 and thereupon entered into government service as a junior librarian in the Royal Library (Gyujanggak).

Min continued to rise through the ranks of Joseon officialdom, holding a succession of posts including a position in the Office of Special Advisors (Hongmungwan 弘文館) and tutor to the Crown Prince. Min was one of the favorite officials of the King. With the love of the King, Min was appointed as important posts. When Seoul was shaken by the Soldier's Rebellion triggered by the disgruntled royal palace guards who had not received their wages for several months in 1882, Min's father was killed by the followers of Daewongun. As a result, Min resigned his posts and went into mourning. His aversion of the ancient military systems also contributed to the leaving of Min. In 1884, Min reentered public service and was appointed an official of the Board of Personnel (Ijo 吏曹). In March 1886, Min was ordered to secure Korea's independence by borrowing Russia's influence to check Qing's increasing influence. With Gaehwa Party, Min tried to sign Second Choseon-Russia Secrete Agreement to achieve the King's will. However, this conspiracy was spotted by Min Young-ik, and Yuan Shikai, leading Li Hongzhang to consider abdication of Korean king. Korean king's plan failed, and Gaewha politicians, such as Gim Ga-jin and Gim Hak-wu, were banished. In 1888, Min was appointed as the Military Minister (兵曹判書). Min established Choseon navy or Gi Yeon Hae Bang Young, and employed an American navy instructor to grow a modernised navy. In 1893, Min became the Justice Minister (刑曹判書). On 23 November 1893 (Lunar Calendar), Min was appointed as Mayor of Seoul (漢城府判尹). During the Donghak Peasant Revolution, Min was appointed as Byeol Ip-jik on 14 September 1894 (Lunar Calendar). Min tried to suppress the revolution by stabilising public, arresting revolutionists, providing enough supplies to the Government army, and protecting government offices. Due to his harsh reactions, Min was hated by the revolutionists. Jeon Bongjun, who was the leader of the Donghak, denounced Min as being one of the most corrupted officials in the government with Min Young-jun, and Go Young-gun. After the Revolution, in 1895, Min was appointed as an minister to the United States. However, the murder of the Queen, by Japanese troops in October 1895, prevented him from taking the post.

Visit to Europe 
On 3 April 1896, Min was appointed as special minister to Russia to participate in the coronation of Czar Nicholas II. His delegation carried 17 gifts for Nicholas II. He went to Russia with his secretary Gim Deuk-ryeon, translator Gim Do-il, and vice minister of education Yun Chi-ho. Min received 20,000 Dollars from the Korean government for journey. Min's delegation got on ship named Empress on 11 April in Incheon. Arriving Yokohama on 16 April, they visited Korean Legation and sailed to Canada, and on 29 April, they arrived at Vancouver. On 5 May, they arrived in Montreal. They visited New York City, and embarked RMS Lucania. After 7 days of sailing, Min's delegation arrived in Liverpool. Next day, they arrived at the Berlin Friedrichstraße station, then by 8:00 AM on 18 May, they reached Warsaw. They were welcomed by military officers in there. On 19 May, they got on a train to Moscow, and finally arrived at Moscow on 20 May. Next day, Min visited the Palace of the Governor of Moscow. On 22 May, Min visited the Czar. Min gave the letter of Korean king to the Czar. The Czar answered to Min, "Whenever it shall please your Majesty to inquire into the affairs of Corea, the Envoy extraordinary, is prepared and authorized by his government to present to Your Majesty in full the condition and needs of Corea." In order to contact with Russian politicians, Min visited Saint Petersburg. He met Aleksey Lobanov-Rostovsky, the Minister of Foreign Affairs, and the five requests of the Korean government. The five requests were: providing guards for Korean King, military instructors to modernise the army, advisors for Gungnaebu, cabinet and mines, establishing telephone lines between Russia and Korea, and lending 30,000 Yen to pay off debt. Lobanov answered that they will answer as soon as possible. On 13 June, Min got answers from Lobanov. Answers wrote that providing guards for the Korean King will not be possible because of predictable conflicts against English or German. He agreed with sending an economy instructor for paying off debt, establishing telephone lines and sending military inspectors. Even though Russia showed a half-hearted answer to Korea, Min was able to bring 13 Russian military instructors. These instructors were contract workers of the Joseon Government with three years of service. After getting answer from Lobanov, Min's delegation stayed in Russia until August and inspected Russian facilities, including military bases, courts, prisons, schools, and military bases. Then, they returned to Korea through Novgorod, Irkutsk, Khabarovsk, and Vladivostok, finally returning on 21 October 1896 and gave the letter of Nicholas II to Gojong in Russian legation. Soon after his return, Min got interviewed by the Tongnip Sinmun. Min said that the trip to Europe made him a new man. He proclaimed that he would do anything for the reform of Korea. Right after the journey, on 12 November 1896, Min was appointed as Lieutenant general and Minister of Military. 

Min received Russian military instructors on 26 October 1896. Min was expected to be a great military leader to modernise the Korean army. These Russian instructors trained about 800 guards, which helped Gojong to return to the palace from the Russian legation. However, Min had conflicts with Russian instructors, especially Colonel Dmitry Putyata, who was the leader of them. Colonel Putyata complained Min's incapacity for many times. Also, Min carrying out too radical reforms such as requiring short hairstyle made him have some disputes with others, which ended up resigning the post on 15 January 1897. On 11 January 1897, Min was again sent to Europe as Korean minister plenipotentiary to the Diamond Jubilee of Queen Victoria, and received 40,000 Dollars from the Government as the expense for his trip. Min resided in Saint Petersburg for diplomatic service, but only stayed in Saint Petersburg only for few days, and left without proper process. Min left Europe on 17 July 1897 without finishing his duty, and visited America, which delayed deployment of Russian instructors in Korea. Gojong removed him from his position on 30 July 1897.

Korean Empire and suicide 
Upon his return to Korea, Min was an active supporter of the Independence Club, and was interviewed by its newspaper The Independent (Dongnip Sinmun 獨立新聞). Two diplomatic trips to Europe made Min to be deeply engage in Gwangmu Reform. Despite he request many reforms, only some (mostly about military) were actually executed. After Bak Jeongyang cabinet was formed, Min returned to the Korean politics as a Special official of Gungnaebu. Then on 12 October 1898, Min was appointed as Minister of Military. Min ordered all officers and soldiers to wear military uniforms on 14 October 1898. On 5 November 1898, Min founded Heunghwa School arguing that people should import Western culture. He was appointed as Chamjung of the State Council of Korean Empire on 21 November 1898. He was removed from the position of Chamjung, and was appointed as Minister of Interior and Special official of Gungnaebu on 24 November 1898. The same day, Min was appointed as acting Minister of Military. However, because of the disapproval of the Hwanguk club, Min was removed from his post. On 4 December 1898, Min became Chamjung of State Council of Korean Empire, and Minister of Economy on 20 December 1898. He realised the reason why tax was not collected was because local officials are corrupted, and tried to stop the corruption of the local officials. However, disapproval of the Imperial Consort Sunheon, threatened his position as a minister. On 22 January 1899, Min was removed from his office of Minister of Economy, and was appointed as Jejo of the Gyeonghyojoen. During this period, the Emperor tried to establish a conservative government without reform-advocating officials like Min or Han Kyu-seol. On 15 March 1899, Min was appointed as envoy reside in America. When Prince Henry of Prussia visited Korea, Min greeted him in the port. He returned Korea on 20 November 1898. On 19 February 1900, Min became head of accounting of the Board of Marshals, and for his service as the head of accounting of the Board of Marshals, Min received 1st Class of the Order of the Taegeuk. He simultaneously acted as the military police commander from 2 August 1900, and on 9 August Min was appointed as President of the Awarding section. In 1902, Min established Reform party with Yi Dong-hwi. The party succeeded the Independence Club as the reforming fraction of Imperial Korea.

On 21 November 1902, Yuminwon was established and Min was appointed as the president of it, and on 23 November 1902, Min was ordered to simultaneously serve as the President of Suminwon, which supervised the passport affairs of Korean Empire. On 13 October 1903, Min resigned from the office of President of the Awarding section. On 16 January 1904, Min was appointed as the president of Yeshik-won, but he resigned the post on 23 February 1904. On 1 March 1904, Min was appointed as the Minister of Interior, but shortly after he resigned and became the Minister of Education on 8 March 1904. As the Minister of Education, Min criticized the neglected ministry, and tried to appoint government officials among the graduates of public schools, and graduates of private school should enter the officialdom with an exam. The reform that Min desired to bring was planned to be a gradual change in 3 or 4 years. Moreover, he advised every children to attend school. Regarding the Korean invasion of Manchuria, Min disagreed with the summon of Yi Bum-yun and claimed that Qing officials are spreading rumors about Korean forces in the area. On May 25, Min resigned from his post of Minister of Education, and on 26 May 1904, Min was appointed as head of accounting of the Board of Marshals. On 26 August 1904, Min was appointed as one of the editors military system of the Imperial Korean Army. For his merits, Min got Order of the Plum Blossom on 16 September 1904. His opposition against the Japan–Korea Treaty of 1904 made Min to be posted as the chief of equerry, which was a comparable sinecure. Opposing the pro-Japanese cabinet, Min served as leisurely posts. Moreover, Min had rivalries with the Iljinhoe, a pro-Japanese organization established by Song Byeong-jun. On 26 March 1905, Min was appointed as the prime minister following the resignation of Cho Byeong-shik. As the prime minister, Min tried to stop shaman from being spread, which was illegal but already widespread. He recommended using police forces to ban shaman and his request was accepted. He was removed from his post on 4 April 1905, and became chief of equerry on June 24. On 9 September 1905, Min was appointed as the Minister of Foreign Affairs. Shortly after the appointment, Min resigned his office. Min recommended Han Kyu-seol as the next prime minister in order to prevent Korea being Japanese protectorship. Min and Han sent Syngman Rhee to America to claim the independence of Korea. Japanese minister residing in Korea Hayashi Gonsuke wrote the reason why Min lost his political power was because of his ineffectiveness to manage the chaotic situation in Korea.

On November 17, 1905, Japan succeeded in foisting upon Korea the Eulsa Treaty making Korea a Japanese protectorship. It is said that upon hearing of the treaty three days after it had been concluded, Min "fainted several times and vomited blood". Min pleaded with Emperor Gojong to annul the treaty and execute the five Korean officials who had signed it, now widely referred to as the "Five Traitors of Eulsa" (Eulsa ojeok). Even though the emperor illegalised the appealing the punishments for the five traitors, Min did not followed order and asked again on 29 November 1905. He and Jo Byeong-se, who asked the Emperor with Min, waited for the Emperor's answers in Dae Ahan gate of the Deoksugung. The Japanese military police imprisoned Min and Jo in Pyeong-li won, the supreme court of Imperial Korea. After being released, Min realised that he should commit suicide. He returned to house of Yi Won-sik, and committed suicide there with a small knife. He tried twice to kill himself on that day. The first trial was unsuccessful because the knife was too short to kill him. The second trial was successful in killing himself. After this death, in his pockets were found five identical messages on the back of his calling cards to the representatives of China, Great Britain, the United States, France, and Germany in which he pleaded with those powers to recognize the true situation within Korea. He also left a final message directed towards the people of Korea (see below), in which he promised to help his fellow countrymen "from the nether world" if they would strengthen their collective will and spirit and exercise their learning in an all out effort to "restore our [Korean] freedom and independence." Min received a state funeral from the government. About 6,000 to 7,000 people attended his funeral. Thousands of people mourned for his death. Yun Chi-ho wrote the following about Min's death: "Min Yong Whan committed suicide. I wish he had died fighting, if he had decided to die. All honors to his calm courage. All honors to his patriotism. All honors to his heroic death. His death will do more good than his life."

After death 

Some officials, including Jo Byeongse, and his rickshaw puller, committed suicide following Min's death.

Min was posthumously appointed as Dae-Gwang-Bo-Guk-Seung-Rok Dae-bu(大匡輔國崇祿大夫), which was the highest office of the Joseon officialdom. Gojong gave him posthumous name "Chung mun", and Order of the Golden Ruler for his honour to the country. His posthumous name was revised to "Chung jeong" on 3 December 1905. He was buried in Yongin. Min was enshrined in the Jongmyo on 16 February 1921.

After the independence of Korea, Min was commemorated as one of the zealot in December 1945. According to a survey done to Korean students in 1952, Min was one of the most respected people along with Sejong the Great, and Yi Sun-sin. In 1962 Min was posthumously awarded the Order of Merit for National Foundation by the South Korean government.

Reforms 
His journey to Europe made him to have a great desire of reforming his country. For this reason, Min was supported by Independence Club and acted as one of the key ministers of Gwangmu Reform.

Military reforms and political reforms 
Since Min visited many European countries and witnessed their military system, he was considered as the best man to mobilise the Imperial Korean Army by Europeans. However, Min did not met the expectations after he was appointed as minister of military. He brought Russian military instructors to modernise the army in 1896 and was appointed as Minister of Military. However, min was criticized by Russian officers that he did not met the expectation. Even not meeting the expectation, Min still knew that the military system of Joseon should be modernised, and tried to carry on military reforms. He engaged in the establishment of Military Academy of Korean Empire. He contributed to the augment of the Qinwidae, establishment of the Siwidae, the military band and the Board of Marshals. In 1904, Min was appointed as one of the Editors of Military system, even though it was a military reform led by Imperial Japan to check the growing of Imperial Korean Army. 

Min was part of composing the National anthem of the Korean Empire where he wrote the lyrics of it. He also tried to increase the authority of the Emperor by making an ensign of Emperor, Crown Prince, and Princes. Simultaneously, Min supported Korean parliament, Jungchuwon, which weakened the authority of the Emperor. When government led by Bak Jeongyang and Min was formed on 13 October 1897, after days of protests of the Independence Club, the government started to actually establish a parliament. However, the emperor checked the reform advocating government officials, such as Min, by posting pro-Russian, conservative officials in important positions. As a result of these efforts of Min, Bak, and members of the Independence Club, a proper parliament, Jungchuwon was established.

Supporting Independence Club 
Min was a great supporter of the Independence club. He was part of the club from when it was Jeongdong Club, with Yun Chi-ho, Ye Wanyong, Yi Sang-jae, and Soh Jaipil. From many travels around the world, Min realised the need of the Joseon to reform its system. Because of this, Min had conflicts with the Hwangguk Club, a conservative club of Korea which hated Independence club, and members of Hwangguk Club even tried to murder Min. Min's support of Independence Club made him to fall from power when Independence Club was dissolved by false rumors of their political rivals.

Education 
Min stressed the importance of education. He investigated some schools with his own property. He established a school named Heunghwa school. Min was the first principal of the school. The school grew larger because it was the only school with night-time courses. However, the increase of students also led to a financial hardship, which led the school to disestablish in 1911.

Blood Bamboo 
One year after Min's death, it was widely reported that a bamboo plant appeared where his bloody clothes had been laid. Many people thought the bamboo grew nurtured by Min's blood so that the bamboo was called Hyeoljuk (血竹), or "Blood Bamboo". Mysteriously, the number of its leaves was 45, Min's age at the time of his death.

Assessment 
Horace Newton Allen wrote, "Min Yong Whan. Formerly known as the Good Min, latterly somewhat disappointing. Good intentions but feeble and vacillating. Ostensibly the present head of the Min clan," about Min.

Gallery

Family 
 Great-Great-Great-Great-Great-Grandfather
 Min Yu-jung (민유중, 閔維重) (1630 - 1687); Queen Inhyeon's father
 Great-Great-Great-Great-Great-Grandmother
 Internal Princess Consort Pungchang of the Pungyang Jo clan (풍창부부인 풍양 조씨, 豊昌府夫人 豊壤 趙氏) (1659 - 1720); Min Yu-jung's third wife
 Great-Great-Great-Great-Grandfather
 Min Jin-yeong (민진영, 閔鎭永) (1682 - 1724); Queen Inhyeon's younger half-brother
 Great-Great-Great-Grandfather
 Min Ak-su (민악수, 閔樂洙)
 Great-Great-Grandfather
 Min Baek-sul (민백술, 閔百述)
 Great-Grandfather
 Min Dan-hyeon (민단현, 閔端顯)
 Great-Grandmother
 Lady Park of the Malyang Park clan (본관: 말양 박씨, 朴氏); (박일환의 딸) daughter of Park Il-hwan (박일환, 朴日焕)
 Grandfather
 Min Chi-gu (민치구, 閔致久) (1795-1874)
 Grandmother
 Lady Yi of the Jeonju Yi clan (? - 17 November 1873). (전주 이씨, 全州 李氏); (이옥의 딸) daughter of Yi Ok of Dongdeokrang (1773 - 1820) (통덕랑 이옥, 李火玉); aunt to Yi Ha-jeon, Prince Gyeongwon (경원군 이하전) (1842 - 1862)
 Father
 Min Gyeom-ho (민겸호, 閔謙鎬) (1838 - 10 June 1882)
Step Father
Min Tae-ho (민태호, 閔泰鎬) (1828 - ?)
 Mother
 Lady Seo (서씨, 徐氏); (서경순의 딸) daughter of Seo Gyeong-sun (서경순, 徐庚淳)
 Sibling(s)
 Younger brother: Min Yeong-chan (민영찬, 閔泳瓚) (1873 - 1948)
 Sister-in-law: Lady Kang of the Geumcheon Kang clan (금천 강씨, 衿川 姜氏); Min Yeong-chan's first wife
 Sister-in-law: Lady Me-ri of the Hu clan (후메이리, 胡美梨); Min Yeong-chan's second wife (Chinese)
 Nephew: Min Hong-sik (민홍식, 閔弘植)
 Niece: Lady Min 
 Wife and children
Lady Park Soo-young of the Bannam Park clan (박수영 반남 박씨); daughter of Park Yong-hun (박용훈)
Son: Min Beom-sik (민범식, 閔範植) (1896 - 1934): Studied abroad in France and Germany but did not have a notable occupation because of the Japanese interruption.
Grandson: Min Byeong-cheol (민병철, 閔丙哲)
Grandson: Min Byeong-gi (민병기, 閔丙岐) (1926 - 1986); former professor at Korea University
Grandson: Min Byeong-il (민병일, 閔丙逸)
Son: Min Jang-sik (민장식, 閔章植)
Grandson: Min Byeong-deok (민병덕, 閔丙德)
Grandson: Min Byeong-jin (민병진, 閔丙鎭)
Son: Min Gwang-sik (민광식, 閔光植)
Grandson: Min Byeong-seop (민병섭, 閔丙燮)
Grandson: Min Byeong-geon (민병건, 閔丙建)

Popular culture
 Played by Choe Jang-so in the 1984 North Korean film An Emissary of No Return.
 Portrayed by Jo Seung-yeon in the 2012 film Gabi.

Honours 

 Order of the Golden Ruler (Posthumously) on 1 December 1905
 Order of the Plum Blossom on 16 September 1904
 Order of the Taeguk 1st Class on 22 April 1900

Foreign awards 

 Order of the White Eagle on 24 October 1896

 Order of the Rising Sun 1st Class on 30 March 1904

References

Notelist

Further reading

 

1861 births
1905 deaths
People from Seoul
19th-century Korean people
20th-century Korean people
Recipients of the Order of Merit for National Foundation
Yeoheung Min clan
Lieutenant generals of Korean Empire
Officials of the Korean Empire
Suicides by sharp instrument
Imperial Korean military personnel
Politicians of the Korean Empire
Recipients of the Order of the White Eagle (Russia)